Dolphin Island may refer to:

Places
 Dolphin Island (Western Australia), Australia
 Dolphin Island (Nunavut), Canada
 Dolphin Island (Fiji)
 Dolphin Island, a popular name for Gallo Lungo, a dolphin-shaped island in the Italian archipelago of Sirenuse
 Dolphin Island (Jamaica), off Jamaica
 Dolphin Island, an outlying peak of the Hogup Mountains, Utah, U.S.
 Dolphin Island (Vanuatu)

Other uses
 Dolphin Island (film), a 2021 family film
 Dolphin Island (novel), by Arthur C. Clarke, 1963
 Dolphin Island: Underwater Adventures, a 2009 video game 
 Dolphin Island (Iruka Jima), Japan, a dolphinarium
 Dolphin Island, an attraction at Resorts World Sentosa, Singapore

See also
 Dauphin Island, Alabama, a town in the U.S.
 Dolphin (disambiguation)